Pseudocatharylla tisiphone is a moth in the family Crambidae. It was described by Graziano Bassi in 1999. It is found in Cameroon, the Republic of the Congo and the Democratic Republic of the Congo.

References

Crambinae
Moths described in 1999